The following is a list of annual leaders in fielding errors in Major League Baseball (MLB), with separate lists for the American League and the National League. The list also includes several professional leagues and associations that were never part of MLB.

In baseball statistics, an error is an act, in the judgment of the official scorer, of a fielder misplaying a ball in a manner that allows a batter or baserunner to advance one or more bases or allows an at bat to continue after the batter should have been put out.

Herman Long is the all-time leader in errors, committing 1,096 in his career. Long and Billy Shindle hold the record for most fielding errors in a season, with Long committing 122 errors in 1889, and Shindle committing 122 errors the following year in 1890. Tim Anderson and Rafael Devers are the active leaders in fielding errors and have led the league 2 times.



American League

National League

American Association

National Association

Union Association

Player's League

Federal League

References

Baseball-Reference.com

Major League Baseball statistics
Major League Baseball lists